Kafirin is a class of prolamine storage protein found in grain sorghum.

References 

Seed storage proteins